The Battle of Zhvanets, or the siege of Zhvanets was one of battles of the Khmelnytsky Uprising. It took place between late August and mid-December 1653, when forces of the Polish–Lithuanian Commonwealth, together with King Jan Kazimierz Waza were surrounded in and near Zhvanets by Zaporozhian Cossacks and Crimean Tatars, commanded Bohdan Khmelnytsky. The siege ended when Poles agreed to renew the Treaty of Zboriv.

Background  
Despite poor quality of Polish soldiers and their officers, as cream of the Polish Army had been murdered in the Batih massacre (June 1652), the spring offensive of 1653 progressed successfully. The situation changed when Khmelnytsky’s Cossacks joined forces with Tatars commanded personally by Islam III Giray. When news of this reached King Jan Kazimierz Waza, he decided to abandon his positions in Bar, Ukraine, and head towards Zhvanets, to await Moldavian and Transilvanian reinforcements. 

The reinforcements were inadequate: George II Rakoczi sent 2000 soldiers, while Gheorghe Stefan, only 1000.

The siege  
Bohdan Khmelnytsky decided not to make a frontal attack of the Polish camp. Instead, he chose a long-lasting siege, which began in late August 1653, and dragged on throughout autumn into December. As time went by and the weather worsened, Polish defenders began to starve, and a number of soldiers fled their positions in search of food. The situation was anxiously observed by Khan Islam III Giray, who did not wish for complete destruction of Polish forces, as this would eventually strengthen the Cossacks, who, despite the temporary alliance, were his traditional enemies. Furthermore, in late autumn news from Moscow came: the Russians wanted to protect Ukraine, and wage war against Poland. 

Under the circumstances, on December 16, 1653, Poles and Tatars agreed to an oral truce. Khmelnytsky had to end the siege: his only achievement was that the Poles agreed to renew the Treaty of Zboriv. Polish Army finally left the camp, while Cossacks headed towards Pereyaslav, where the Treaty of Pereyaslav was signed in 1654.

References

Władysław Andrzej Serczyk: Na płonącej Ukrainie. Dzieje Kozaczyzny 1648-1651. Warszawa: Książka i Wiedza, 1998, p. 328-329. .
 Maciej Franz: Wojskowość Kozaczyzny Zaporoskiej w XVI-XVII wieku. Geneza i charakter. Toruń: Adam Marszałek, 2004, p. 222. .

Conflicts in 1653
1653 in Europe
Zhvanets